Operation Panga was a military operation launched by the Rhodesian Security Forces (RSF) against a camp belonging to the communist insurgent group, ZIPRA. The cadres camp was located on the Mushenshi River in Zambia.

Background
At this point in the war Rhodesia's political and military position appeared to be a strong one. Nationalist guerrillas had been unable to make serious military inroads against Rhodesia. In the early 1970s the two main nationalist groups faced serious internal divisions, aid from the Organisation of African Unity was temporarily suspended in 1971 and 129 nationalists were expelled from Zambia after they were alleged to have plotted against President Kenneth Kaunda. Furthermore Britain's efforts to isolate Rhodesia economically had not forced major compromises from the Smith Government. 

In 1971, Rhodesia joined Alcora Exercise, a secret defensive alliance for Southern Africa, formalised in 1970 by Portugal and South Africa. Alcora formalised and deepened the political and military co-operation between the three countries in the fight against the revolutionary insurgency in the territories of Rhodesia, Angola, Mozambique and South West Africa and in the prevention of possible external aggression to those territories from the hostile neighbouring countries.

The Raid
On 17 April 1971 a ten-strong force from the Rhodesian SAS, supported by the Rhodesian Air Force (RhAF) attacked the ZIPRA camp. During the raid one cadre was killed and another was wounded. Once the SAS team had secured the camp the troopers discovered enemy intelligence whilst recovering the enemy’s equipment. All of this was then brought back to Rhodesia when the SAS team was picked up by air force helicopters.

References

Bibliography

1971 in Rhodesia
Panga
April 1971 events in Africa